Butt rot is a disease of plants, mostly trees, caused by fungi. The fungus attacks the moist, poorly protected undersurface of tree trunk's thickest part (the "butt" above the root, as opposed to "top"), where the end of the stem makes contact with the soil.  It may affect the roots as well, causing a disease known as root rot.  It then moves up into the interior of the plant, producing a roughly conical column of dead, rotted plant matter, up to one and a half meters long in severe cases.  Such an infection is likely to impair the transport properties of the xylem tissue found at the center of the stem.  It also weakens the stem and makes the plant more vulnerable to toppling.  One particularly virulent species of fungus associated with butt rot is Serpula himantioides.

See also 
 Ganoderma zonatum
 Phaeolus schweinitzii

External links 
 Root and Butt Rots of Oaks – North Carolina State University

Fungal tree pathogens and diseases